Super Roots 2 is the second installment of the Super Roots EP series by Japanese experimental band Boredoms. It was mailed to people in Japan who completed and sent a survey card enclosed with the Japanese release of Chocolate Synthesizer.

Because of its short duration, it was the only Super Roots not to be rereleased by Vice Records in 2007.

Track listing
"Sexy Boredoms" – 0:55
"Go Come Uparks" – 1:18
"Magic Milk" – 1:43
"White Plastic See-Thru Finger" – 2:02
"Boxodous (Noise Ramones Mix)" – 0:32

References

Boredoms EPs
1994 EPs